Man Against the Mob (also known as Trouble in the City of Angels) is a 1988 NBC television movie directed by Steven Hilliard Stern,  starring George Peppard, Kathryn Harrold and Max Gail. Man Against the Mob is a precursor of the 2013 theatrical feature Gangster Squad, in that it deals with the post-war formation of a special LAPD unit set up to suppress Organized Crime in Los Angeles. It may have been inspired by the success of the 1987 theatrical feature The Untouchables, a period drama which also depicted an elite law enforcement unit pitted against mobsters. This was designed around the actor George Peppard as a tough LA cop in the late 1940s. A December 10, 1989 NBC-TV movie follow-up, Man Against the Mob: The Chinatown Murders, is a sequel that also stars Peppard, reuniting him with his co-star from The Blue Max, Ursula Andress. The first movie was a pilot of a proposed NBC series entitled City of Angels but ended up panning out as only the two TV movies before George Peppard died in 1994.

Background and plot
Investigating a brutal homicide, Peppard discovers that the killing is more than a common sex crime.  A trail of evidence leads Peppard to a group of visiting Chicago mobsters, and ultimately to several of Los Angeles' better known citizens. Set in Los Angeles in the 1940s just after the War, the script has some pointed humour and there are witty lines and dialogue exchanges.  Kathryn Harrold plays a War widow who is the love interest.  He has lost his wife, Kathryn has lost her husband, and they both slowly get attracted to one another. Steven Stern does a satisfactory job of directing. Peppard's character is heroic, straight and honest, and fights the Mob's attempts to come in from New Jersey and infiltrate L.A., and they are being aided by an entire division of corrupt L.A. cops known as 'Metro Division'.  Peppard escapes several assassination attempts, won't give up, and becomes pretty much a lone wolf as his few supporters are killed around him. Stella Stevens plays an owner of a nightclub. Part of the shooting of the movie was done at the Drake Hotel in Chicago as well as older historic hotels in Los Angeles in the MacArthur Park area.

Featured cast

Reception
It was the 17th highest rated show of the week.

Production information, crew, credits, misc.
Production Companies: NBC, Von Zerneck Sertner Films, Worldwide Media 
Executive Producers: Frank Von Zerneck, Robert M. Sertner
Producers: Phillips Wylly Sr., Steven Hilliard Stern
Co-Producer: John Rester Zodrow
Associate Producer: Susan Weber-Gold
Director: Steven Hilliard Stern
Editor: Barrett Taylor
Negative cutter: Susanne Gervay
Assistant Editor: Bob Leader
Casting: Dick Dinman
Music: Artie Kane
Music editor: John Mick
Music Supervisor: Terri Fricon
Extras Casting: Bill Dance
Actors/musicians (in club scenes): Luis Bonilla, Jack Cooper, Phil Feather, Alan Parr, Charlie Richard 
Production Manager: Phillips Wylly Sr.
Assistant Directors: Ray Marsh, James J. Fitzpatrick
Location Managers: Flip Wylly, Barry S. Jones
Script Supervisor: Lee Nowak
Production Coordinator: Anne Hart
Production Designer: Shay Austin
Set Decorator: Debra Combs
Sound, Sound mixer: Richard Lightstone
Sound re-recording: Wayne Artman, Tom Beckert, Tom Dahl
Sound Effects: Rich Harrison
Director of Photography: Denis Lewiston
Camera Operator: Monty Rowan
Costumes: Donna Roberts-Orme
Hair Stylist: DeAnn Power
Makeup: Davida W. Simon

Critiques, reviews, ratings
There is an interesting entry by James Robert Parish in his book Prostitution in Hollywood films: plots, critiques, casts, and credits for 389 theatrical and made-for-television releases (1992) talking about the plot and the use of prostitution as part of the two Man Against the Mob TV movies.

review
"...thanks to George Peppard's performance the film scored excellent ratings when first telecast in 1988. A 1989 TV-movie followup, Man Against the Mob: The Chinatown Murders failed to match the ratings of the first effort." Hal Erickson - Allrovi

Awards

1989 Edgar Allan Poe Awards
Best Television Feature or Miniseries writing: David J. Kinghorn

References

External links

Man Against The Mob at TCM Movie Database

Man Against The Mob, Movies at The New York Times
Man Against the Mob at MSN Entertainment

1988 television films
1988 films
1988 crime drama films
1980s American films
1980s English-language films
1980s police procedural films
American crime drama films
American drama television films
American police detective films
Crime television films
Films about the Los Angeles Police Department
Films about organized crime in the United States
Films directed by Steven Hilliard Stern
Films scored by Artie Kane
Films set in the 1940s
Films set in Chicago
Films set in Los Angeles
Films shot in Chicago
Films shot in Los Angeles
NBC network original films